Bosporus tunnel may refer to any of several tunnels under the Bosporus, connecting the European and Asian sides of Istanbul, specifically:
 The Bosporus Water Tunnel, an aqueduct
 The Marmaray Tunnel, a railway tunnel
 The Eurasia Tunnel, a road tunnel